Francisco José Martínez Pérez (born 14 May 1983 in Churriana de la Vega) is a Spanish former professional cyclist. He rode in 3 editions of the Vuelta a España.

Palmares
2003
7th Overall Volta ao Algarve
2008
5th Overall Circuito Montañes

References

1983 births
Living people
Spanish male cyclists
Sportspeople from the Province of Granada
Cyclists from Andalusia